

Active ships

Antarctic patrol vessel
  (2011–) which carries the survey motor boat (SMB) James Caird IV.

Ocean survey vessels
  (1997–)

Coastal survey vessels
 Echo-class multi–purpose survey vessels
  (2003–) which carries SMB Sapphire. 
  (2003–) which carries SMB Spitfire. 
 Survey Motor Launch
  (2018–)

Decommissioned ships

Antarctic patrol vessels
  (1955–70)
  (1968–91)
  (1991–2008)

Ocean survey vessels
 
  (1964–97)
  (1965–90)
  (1966–86)
  (1974–2001)

Coastal survey vessels
 
  (1968–2002)
  (1968–2001)
  (1968–91)
  (1968–89)
  (1986–2010)

Inshore survey vessels
 
  (1958–85)
  (1959–85)
  (1959–85)
 
 HMS Waterwitch (ex–HMS Powderham) (1964–86)
 HMS Woodlark  (ex–HMS Yaxham) (1964–86)
 
 HMS Mermaid (ex–HMS Sullington) (1964–68)
 HMS Myrmidon (ex–HMS Edderton) (1964–68)

Survey Motor Launches (SML)
 SML 2
 SML 4
 SML 6
 SML 322
 SML 323
 SML 324
 SML 325
 SML 326
  (ex–HDML 1301) (1945–1966)
  (ex–HDML 1387) (1952–1965)
  (1983–2018)

Earlier survey vessels 
  (1666–1698), the Navy's first hydrographic survey vessel
  (1839–65)
  (1867–88)
 
   (1906–14, 1920–24)
  (1913–42)
  (1918–19)
  (1932–53)
  (1939–45)
  (1954–71)
 
  (1920–35)
  (1920–38)
  (1920–38)
  (1920–38)
 
  (1923–31)
 HMS Herald (ex–HMS Merry Hampton) (1924–39)
  (1924–36)
 
  (1936–39)
 
  (1938)
  (1938)
 
  (1938–52)
  (1938–39)
  (1938–39)
  (1939–64)
  (1946–50)
  (1946–62) – renamed HMS Shackleton, 1955
 
  (1948–68)
  (1949–65)
  (1950–64)
  (1950–66)

References

 

Lists of Royal Navy ships by type
 List